This list of fossil arthropods described in 2012 is a list of new taxa of trilobites, fossil insects, crustaceans, arachnids and other fossil arthropods of every kind that have been described during the year 2012. The list only includes taxa at the level of genus or species.

Arachnids

Crustaceans

Insects

Trilobites

References

Arthropod paleontology
Lists of arthropods
2010s in paleontology
Paleontology
2011 in paleontology